The discography of Siouxsie and the Banshees, an English rock band, consists of eleven studio albums, three live albums, four compilation albums, one extended play (EP), and thirty singles. This list does not include material recorded by band members with the Creatures or the Glove, or solo work by Siouxsie Sioux and Steven Severin.

This page lists albums, singles, and compilations by the band Siouxsie and the Banshees, alongside their chart positions, release date, and sales achievements in the United Kingdom.

In the UK, the band has eight BPI-certified Silver albums and two Gold albums.

In 2020, a limited edition of Once Upon a Time/The Singles on clear vinyl was released with an extra poster included. In 2021, a limited edition of Tinderbox on burgundy coloured vinyl, was released for the 35th anniversary of the album.

In 2022, a new 10 track compilation All Souls, including a selection of singles, album tracks and b-sides curated by Siouxsie, was released on black vinyl and also on orange vinyl - in limited edition.

A clear and gold marbled vinyl edition of A Kiss in the Dreamhouse will be released for Record Store Day 2023 on April 22, in the UK, France, Germany, Australia, Ireland, and Italia.

Albums

Studio albums

Live albums

Compilation albums

Extended plays

Singles

Limited fan club releases

Other appearances: songs specifically recorded for movie soundtracks

Limited promotional edition with exclusive track
 1992 "4-Cut Sampler" [including "Overground" (Live at the KROQ Acoustic Christmas Show - LA 21 December 1991)] [US Geffen Promo CD]

Videos
 1981 Once Upon a Time/The Singles VHS
 1983 Nocturne VHS (from two 1983 performances at the Royal Albert Hall)
 1992 Twice Upon a Time – The Singles VHS

DVDs
 2003 The Seven Year Itch 
 2004 The Best of Siouxsie and the Banshees, Sound & Vision edition, (bonus DVD that includes music videos for all the featured songs on the main disc excluding "Dizzy").
 2006 Nocturne (remastered version of the 1983 concerts, omitting "Paradise Place", "Dear Prudence", "Slowdive" and "Happy House")
 2009 At the BBC (DVD featuring all live performances recorded by BBC Television, included in a 4 CD box set)

Vinyl reissues
 2014 "Hong Kong Garden" (double 7" also containing "Voices", "Hong Kong Garden" [2006's orchestral introduction] and "Voices" [1984's orchestral version])
 2015 Join Hands (gatefold release with originally-intended artwork for Record Store Day)
 2016 The Scream (picture disc)
 2018 Their 11 studio albums were repressed on 180g black vinyl. There were also two limited editions: a gold vinyl reissue of Juju limited to 1,000 copies and a blue vinyl reissue of  The Scream limited to 1,000 copies. 
 2019 A purple/black/white splatter vinyl reissue of Hyæna, limited to 1,000 copies, was released in June.
 2020 A limited edition of Once Upon A Time: The Singles on clear vinyl was released in December with an extra poster.
 2021  A limited burgundy coloured vinyl of Tinderbox was released in October.
 2022 A new 10 track compilation All Souls, [including "Fireworks", "Supernatural Thing", "El Dia de los Muertos" and "Something Wicked (This Way Comes)" plus other songs such as "Spellbound"], was released on black vinyl, and also on orange vinyl.
 2023 A clear and gold marbled vinyl reissue of A Kiss in the Dreamhouse, limited to 1,500 copies, will be released for Record Store Day on April 22nd, in the UK, France, Germany, Australia, Ireland, and Italia.

Other release
 2014 It's a Wonderfull Life [A Journey into Sound by Siouxsie Sioux and Steven Severin] (a 14-track CD compilation for Mojo magazine in November 2014; includes a selection of songs from movie soundtracks, TV soundtracks and more)

Music videos

References

Discographies of British artists
Rock music group discographies
New wave discographies